Donnie Loves Jenny is an American reality television series which premiered on January 7, 2015, on the A&E cable network. Announced in November 2014, the series chronicles the lives of Donnie Wahlberg and Jenny McCarthy as newlyweds. The series premiered with a one-hour wedding episode.

The show is co-produced by D&J Productions, a production company launched by Wahlberg and McCarthy. Both of them have previously appeared on Wahlburgers, another reality series which airs on the same network. "We’re thrilled to join Donnie and Jenny as they begin the next chapter of their lives," said David McKillop, Executive Vice President of the network. "Viewers have enjoyed following their relationship on ‘Wahlburgers’ and we look forward to sharing this next part of their journey," he also added.

Episodes

Season 1 (2015)

Season 2 (2015)

Season 3 (2016)

References

External links 

 
 
 

2010s American reality television series
2015 American television series debuts
English-language television shows
A&E (TV network) original programming
2016 American television series endings
Television series about marriage
Wahlberg family
American television spin-offs
Reality television spin-offs